"Main Chala"is an Indian Hindi-language Bollywood song by Guru Randhawa and Iulia Vantur.The song ‘Main Chala’ released, got more than millions of views in a few minutes. A new music video titled Main Chala, starring actors Salman Khan and Pragya Jaiswal, has recently been released online. It also features artists Guru Randhawa and Iulia Vantur. Salman Khan-Pragya Jaiswal looks dreamy in the love song of Guru Randhawa-Iulia Vantur. A long-awaited music video featuring Bollywood star Salman Khan and Pragya Jaiswal has been released. 'Main Chala' is a love music video featuring the rumored Salman's girlfriend Lulia Vantur and Guru Randhawa, who have sung the song.

References

Hindi songs